The Athletic Union of Greek Alexandria (AEEA) is a Greek sports club based in Alexandria, Egypt. Ιδρύθηκε το 1910 with colors blue and white and double-headed eagle emblem. Later in AEEA merged and Football Club of Greeks of Alexandria, which was also founded in 1910. In the long history of the Union had parts football men and women, basketball men and women, volleyball men and women, gymnastics, athletics, field hockey, and table tennis. Owns a house and struggled in the Community stage of Greek Community.

It was a member of the local Ephorates SEGAS Egypt winning several local tournaments. The track section has participated in many national championships having highlighted many panellinionikes. In July 1939 the Union launched a sports magazine called "Sports Enosis", Bulletin of the Greek league Alexandria, issued at least 1975.

Athletics 
In the classic sports AEEA has participated in many national championships as the local championships Inspectorate SEGAS Egypt. Has highlighted many great athletes. Many of them served as the national team players such as Nicholas in 60. The Gerolaimou the jump discus and shot, K. Varotsis jumps, A. Lane also jumps, the Hatzikostas in shot The Yannopoulos Assouant in discus, the Koutlaki the Borz, Anni shock, and Nicholas Souartz roads speed, Maha to discus, the Vlastoudaki the javelin which had discredited many times the All Egypt record.

1955 AEEA won the tournament in Egypt with diasyllogiko 69 points against 68 of the Nationals Cairo with 6 gold 5 silver and 7 bronze medals. All of the athletes were expatriates except for one Egyptian.

Football 
The football department was struggling early in the local championship winning Alexandria many times the big league with the enemy "Juno Regkresion. At that time in Egypt were three local – regional championships: Cairo, Alexandria and Suez. The first bidding for the Egyptian league.

With the introduction of the League to Egypt AEEA played two years of the National D Egypt and has numerous appearances in the League. The first time in 1948–1949 finishing in ninth place with 17 points, 5 wins, 7 draws, eight defeats and finishes 20–30. And 1949–1950, occupying the 10th place with 14 points, 4 wins, six draws, eight defeats and ending 16–29.

After 1960, when the Greek community has shrunk, the football department at times participate in tournaments or local infrastructure of Alexandria.

Basketball 
Sections basketball AEEA participated in local tournaments local Inspectorate SEGAS winning many of them.

Volleyball 
Sections of AEEA volleyball participated in local tournaments local Inspectorate SEGAS winning many of them.

Hockey 
The field hockey part was founded in 1937 and was among the first groups to cultivate the sport to Egypt. The first league matches due to lack of English was by military groups and the group of "French Union, which disintegrated in the course and athletes joined the AEEA. By the end of World War II participated in Egyptian league leading role in many athletic events.

Table tennis 
The table tennis section of AEEA had many athletes participating primarily in diaspora and the local leagues of Alexandria. The greatest athlete who was revealed Alekos Cassavetes, champion Egypt in 1948 and later Australia s when they migrated there. The Cassavetes had participated with the national team in world championship in 1939 at the Greek individual championship in 1950, where she lost the final by 3–0 Leventis and declared second panellinionikis. In the same event in terms of AEEA had taken part and: Vavakis, Andreadis. Also, see Psiakis were young Egyptian champion in 1959  and showed other ping ponistes.

The female section highlighted several major athletes. Among them were: Lite and coconut, which moved to Panathinaikos. The coconut had even grown champions Egypt in maidens (under 17) in 1965. Thalia also highlighted Kyriakou, girls champions Egypt and second in the girls 1967  and Kiki Karampella, homogeny champion league 1959.

Sources 
 "Sports Echo" April 6, 1966, dedicated to Greek clubs in Egypt.
 "Sports Enosis", Bulletin of the Greek league Alexandria, v. 1 (03/07/1939).
 This article is the translation of :el:Αθλητική Ένωση Ελλήνων Αλεξάνδρειας

References 

Football clubs in Alexandria
Association football clubs established in 1910
1910 establishments in Egypt
Greek sports clubs outside Greece